is the name of two train stations in Japan:

 Tokiwadai Station (Osaka)
 Tokiwadai Station (Tokyo)